Mamquam Mountain is a mountain in the Pacific Ranges of the Coast Mountains in southwestern British Columbia, Canada, located  southeast of Eanastick Meadows and  east of Brackendale. It represents the highest summit of the Mamquam Icefield and lies at the southern end of Garibaldi Provincial Park. Mamquam Mountain was named on September 2, 1930 in association with the Mamquam River.

Climate

Based on the Köppen climate classification, Mamquam Mountain is located in the marine west coast climate zone of western North America. Most weather fronts originate in the Pacific Ocean, and travel east toward the Coast Mountains where they are forced upward by the range (Orographic lift), causing them to drop their moisture in the form of rain or snowfall. As a result, the Coast Mountains experience high precipitation, especially during the winter months in the form of snowfall. Temperatures can drop below −20 °C with wind chill factors below −30 °C. The months July through September offer the most favorable weather for climbing Mamquam Mountain.

See also

 List of mountains of Canada
 Geography of British Columbia
 Geology of British Columbia

References

External links
 Weather: Mamquam Mountain
Mamquam Mountain Mapping and Article on Garibaldi Park 2020 Retrieved 2016.12.29
Two-thousanders of British Columbia
Garibaldi Ranges
Sea-to-Sky Corridor
New Westminster Land District